Ak-Kuduk is a village in the Naryn District, Naryn Region of Kyrgyzstan. Its population was 718 in 2021. 

It is located in the zone of expected II-hazard category earthquakes with a possible score of 5-7 units.

References 

Populated places in Naryn Region